{{DISPLAYTITLE:C17H25N}}
The molecular formula C17H25N (molar mass: 243.39 g/mol, exact mass: 243.1987 u) may refer to:

 3-Methyl-PCPy (3-Me-PCPy)
 Phencyclidine, or phenylcyclohexyl piperidine (PCP)

Molecular formulas